Chelae or Chelai was a coastal town of ancient Bithynia located on the Bosphorus. 

Its site is located near Keçili Liman in Asiatic Turkey.

References

Populated places in Bithynia
Former populated places in Turkey
History of Istanbul Province